Ou Dambang Pir ( is a khum (commune) of Sangkae District in Battambang Province in north-western Cambodia.

Villages

 Ou Dambang
 Svay Chrum
 Kampong Mdaok
 Svay Thum
 Dambouk Khpos
 Tuol Lvieng

References

Communes of Battambang province
Sangkae District